Hamilton Plains is a rural locality in the Whitsunday Region, Queensland, Australia.

Geography 
The Proserpine River forms the western, southern and south-eastern boundary of the locality with Myrtle Creek forming the northern and north-eastern boundary. The land is flat and low-lying (approximately 10 metres above sea level). It is entirely freehold land used for cropping, predominantly sugarcane.

The Bruce Highway traverses the locality from south to north-west. The North Coast railway line also traverses the locality from south to north-west, most of the way it runs immediately parallel and west of the highway. There is no railway station serving the locality. There is also a network of cane tramways to deliver harvested sugarcane to the mill in neighbouring Proserpine.

The Proserpine–Shute Harbour Road (State Route 59) starts at an intersection with the Bruce Highway and runs north and then east through the locality.

History 

References 

Whitsunday Region
Localities in Queensland